Semicassis saburon is a species of large sea snail, a marine gastropod mollusc in the family Cassidae, the helmet snails and bonnet snails.

Description

Distribution
This species is present in the Mediterranean Sea and the eastern Atlantic Ocean, from the Bay of Biscay south to Ghana, and west to the Azores, and the Canaries.

References

 Adanson, M., 1757 Histoire naturelle du Sénégal. Coquillages, p. 275 p, 19 pls
 Fischer-Piette, E., 1942. Les mollusques d'Adanson. Journal de Conchyliologie 85: 104-366
 Settepassi F. (1970). Atlante malacologico dei molluschi marini viventi nel Mediterraneo Vol. 1.

External links
 Bruguière J.G. (1789-1792). Encyclopédie méthodique ou par ordre de matières. Histoire naturelle des vers, volume 1. Paris: Pancoucke. Pp. i-xviii, 1-344
 Locard, A. (1886). Prodrome de malacologie française. Catalogue général des mollusques vivants de France. Mollusques marins. Lyon: H. Georg & Paris: Baillière. x + 778 pp
 Defrance J.L.M. (1804-1845). [Mineralogie et Geologie In: Dictionnaire des Sciences Naturelles dans lequel on traite méthodiquement des différens êtres de la nature (par plusieurs professeurs du Jardin du Roi ..., F[rédéric] Cuvier, ed.). Paris.]
 Jeffreys, J. G. (1885). On the Mollusca procured during the 'Lightning' and 'Porcupine' expeditions, 1868-70 (Part IX). Proceedings of the Zoological Society of London. 1885 : 27-63, pl. 4-6
 Bronn, H.G. (1832) Ergebnisse meiner Naturhistorisch-Ökonomischen Reisen. Vol. 2. Skizzen und Ausarbeitungen über Italien, nach einem zweyten Besuche im Jahre 1827. Karl Groos, Heidelburg and Leipzig, xviii + 686 pp., 4 pls.
  0) Pallary, P. (1900). Coquilles marines du littoral du département d'Oran. Journal de Conchyliologie. 48(3): 211-422.
 Philippi, R. A. (1836). Enumeratio molluscorum Siciliae cum viventium tum in tellure tertiaria fossilium, quae in itinere suo observavit. Vol. 1. I-XIV, 1-303, Tab. XIII-XXVIII. Schropp, Berlin
 

Cassidae
Gastropods described in 1792